The Rugby League Four Nations (known as the Ladbrokes Four Nations in 2016, for sponsorship purposes) was a biennial rugby league football tournament run in partnership between the Australian Rugby League Commission, Rugby Football League and New Zealand Rugby League representing the top three nations in the sport: Australia, England and New Zealand. The tournament replaced the previous Tri-Nations format by including a fourth nation that qualifies by winning their respective regional competition in a rotation between Europe and the South Pacific.  France accepted an invitation to play in the inaugural tournament in 2009. No tournament was contested in 2012 to allow teams to prepare for the 2013 Rugby League World Cup. No tournament has been played since 2016.

History

2006–2008: Origins

The Four Nations replaced the Tri-Nations tournament that was contested between Australia, New Zealand and Great Britain. The competition ceased in 2006 with the RLIF wanting more nations to play in regular tournaments with the 'Big Three'. England replaced Great Britain as the third nation and the fourth nation has to qualify, depending on where the tournament is being played the fourth nation is either from the Northern or Southern Hemisphere.

2009–2013: First competitions
The inaugural Four Nations was played in England and France in 2009 with France qualifying to be the fourth nation via winning the 2005 European Championship. The big three dominated the tournament with Australia beating England in the final. The next tournament was played the following year in 2010 with Australia and New Zealand hosting the tournament. PNG qualified as the fourth nation through the 2009 Pacific Cup. The big three again dominated and Australia beat New Zealand in the final for their third title. 2011 was the third consecutive tournament being held in England and Wales, Wales qualified by winning the 2010 European Championship. The final was a repeat of 2009 with Australia beating England. The tournament was not played in 2012 to give teams a rest before the 2013 World Cup.

2014–: Regular competition
The next Four Nations was played in 2014 after the World Cup. The competition was played in the Southern Hemisphere for the first time since 2010 with Samoa qualifying as the fourth nation. Samoa impressed, although they did not win a game they had close games against the big three. New Zealand beat Australia in the final.

The next tournament took place in England in 2016. Scotland qualified for the tournament and also became the first qualifying nation to avoid losing every game when they drew with New Zealand 18-18. The final for the 2016 tournament took place at Anfield Stadium in Liverpool, as compared to Elland Road, Leeds, in 2009 and 2011. Australia won for the third time in five tournaments, defeating New Zealand in the final.

, the tournament has not been played since 2016.

Format

Qualification
The fourth nation alternates between Europe and the Pacific and to date each tournament has seen a different team take part.  Rugby League European Cup decides the qualifier from Europe and the Pacific Rugby League International decides the qualifier from the Pacific.

In 2009 a qualifying tournament was held, the Pacific Cup, involving Papua New Guinea, Samoa, Tonga, Fiji and the Cook Islands. The winners, Papua New Guinea, qualified for the 2010 Four Nations. Likewise in 2010, the European Nations Cup decided the fourth participant in the 2011 tournament, Wales. In 2014, a single game was staged to decide the fourth team for that year with Samoa beating Fiji 32–16. That same year, it was announced that the winner of the 2014 European Cup would qualify for the 2016 Four Nations, the winning team being Scotland who qualified on points difference by just 3 points over France.

Competition
The tournament is organised in round-robin format. Each team plays the others once, before the top two teams play each other in a tournament final. The top two teams are calculated using a league table. Teams receive:

2 points for a win
1 point for a draw
0 points for a loss

For and against then separates teams on equal points.

Results

To date no fourth nation has appeared in the final of the Four Nations and no team from outside of Oceania has won the tournament despite England appearing in two finals, losing both to Australia.  Furthermore, no fourth nation has even won a single game however Scotland managed to draw 18–18 against New Zealand in 2016. Samoa came close to a win in 2014 losing their first two games by just one try.

The largest winning margin in a game was in 2010 when New Zealand beat Papua New Guinea by 76–12, a margin of 64 points.  There has only been two draws in the history of the tournament when Australia and New Zealand fought out a 20–20 draw in the 2009 tournament and again a draw when New Zealand played Scotland in the 2016 tournament with an 18–18 draw.

Tournaments

Standings

Nation Results

Sponsorship

Attendances
(as of 20 November 2016)

Average Attendances
The average attendances of the Four Nations tournaments fluctuate between the northern and southern hemisphere competitions with the southern hemisphere always having higher averages than the previous tournaments in the northern hemisphere.  The largest change between two tournaments was between 2009 and 2010 which saw an 18.45% increase or an average of 3,060.  The largest total stadium capacity was 214,500 in 2010 despite this tournament having the lowest stadium occupancy with 64.10%.

Highest Attendances
To date, there has been 4 attendances over 40,000 and 8 attendances over 30,000.  Three of these attendances were double-headers which took place at Eden Park, Auckland in 2010, Wembley Stadium, London in 2011 and Suncorp Stadium, Brisbane in 2014; the latter two double-headers are also the largest attendances in the respective hemispheres.  Four of these games were tournament finals in 2009, 2010, 2011 and 2016.  Only one final did not have an attendance over 30,000, this being the 2014 edition.

Venues
As of 2016 Four Nations (in order of matches played and highest attendance).

Player statistics
(As of 2016 Four Nations)

Overall try-scorers

Over the history of the competition 125 players have scored tries.  The top try-scorers are Jason Nightingale of New Zealand and Ryan Hall of England with 11 tries each.  The highest try-scorer from a 'fourth nation' is Daniel Vidot from Samoa who scored 3 tries in the 2014 competition.  Australia has had the most try-scorers with 39 different players scoring.  Both Samoa and Scotland have had 8 try-scorers each, making them the 'fourth nations' with the most players scoring.

Top pointscorers
The five highest overall points-scorers are goal-kickers with Johnathan Thurston being top, having scored 126 points; 106 of these points have come from 53 goals.  The highest points-scorers who are not goal kickers are Jason Nightingale and Ryan Hall who have both scored 44 points from 11 tries and are the joint sixth highest points scorers.

See also

Rugby League Tri-Nations
Rugby League World Cup

References

External links